Radek Opršal  (born 9 May 1978, Ostrava, Czechoslovakia) is a retired Czech footballer.

External links
 
 
 

1978 births
Living people
Czech footballers
Czech expatriate footballers
Association football defenders
Expatriate footballers in Romania
Czech expatriate sportspeople in Romania
Expatriate footballers in Slovakia
Czech expatriate sportspeople in Slovakia
Liga I players
Slovak Super Liga players
Sportspeople from Ostrava
FC Hradec Králové players
MFK Vítkovice players
FC Progresul București players
FC Astra Giurgiu players
FC VSS Košice players
Zagłębie Lubin players
FK Inter Bratislava players
Expatriate footballers in Poland
Czech expatriate sportspeople in Poland